The Caudron Type G was a single-engined French biplane built by Caudron, prior to World War I. Developments of the Caudron G saw widespread service in France, Russia and Great Britain.

Specifications

See also

References

Further reading
 
 

1910s French military reconnaissance aircraft
Type G
Sesquiplanes
Single-engined tractor aircraft
Aircraft first flown in 1913
Rotary-engined aircraft